Pat Gallagher (born 29 March 1963) is the Chief executive of Westmeath and a former Labour Party politician. He was a Teachta Dála (TD) for Laois–Offaly from 1992 to 1997.

Previously a workshop manager, Gallagher was elected to Dáil Éireann for the Laois–Offaly constituency during the swing to Labour at the 1992 general election.

Like many Labour TDs elected in 1992, he lost his seat at the 1997 general election. His seat was taken by Tom Enright of Fine Gael. Gallagher was then elected to the 21st Seanad, on the Industrial and Commercial Panel, and served as Whip of the Labour senators from 13 August 1997 to 12 October 1999. He resigned from the Seanad in October 1999. He had previously  unsuccessfully contested the 1989 general election.

He was elected a county councillor for Offaly County Council in 1991 and town councillor in 1994 for Tullamore. He was re-elected to both posts, topping the poll, at the 1999 local elections. He resigned both his seats in 2000. He has not sought political office since.

He was County Manager for Galway County Council from 2004 to 2007, and was County Manager for Offaly County Council from 2007 to 2013. In early 2014, Gallagher was appointed as Chief executive of Westmeath County Council.

References

1963 births
Living people
Labour Party (Ireland) TDs
Members of the 27th Dáil
Members of the 21st Seanad
Local councillors in County Offaly
People from Tullamore, County Offaly
Labour Party (Ireland) senators